Álvaro Clopatofsky  (20 April 1921 – 1993) was a Colombian sports shooter. He competed in the 25 metre pistol event at the 1964 Summer Olympics.

References

External links
 

1921 births
1993 deaths
Colombian male sport shooters
Olympic shooters of Colombia
Shooters at the 1964 Summer Olympics
Sportspeople from Bogotá
20th-century Colombian people